Ravil Manafov (born 1988) is a Kazakhstani water polo player. At the 2012 Summer Olympics, he competed for the Kazakhstan men's national water polo team in the men's event. He is 6 ft 4 inches tall and was born in Alma-Ata.

References

Kazakhstani male water polo players
1988 births
Living people
Sportspeople from Almaty
Olympic water polo players of Kazakhstan
Water polo players at the 2012 Summer Olympics
Asian Games medalists in water polo
Water polo players at the 2006 Asian Games
Water polo players at the 2010 Asian Games
Water polo players at the 2018 Asian Games
Asian Games gold medalists for Kazakhstan
Asian Games bronze medalists for Kazakhstan
Medalists at the 2006 Asian Games
Medalists at the 2010 Asian Games
Medalists at the 2018 Asian Games
21st-century Kazakhstani people